Events from the year 1827 in Ireland.

Events
19–25 April – public theological debates in Dublin between Revs. R. T. P. Pope (Protestant) and Thomas Maguire (Roman Catholic).
6 September–October – Ordnance Survey staff survey a Lough Foyle baseline for their survey of Ireland.
24 September (Feast of Our Lady of Mercy) – Catherine McAuley opens an institution for destitute women and orphans and a school for the poor in Dublin.
The British Army establishes Beggars Bush Barracks.
Clonmel and Multyfarnham Friaries are re-established.
Amhlaoibh Ó Súilleabháin begins his diary, later published as Cín Lae Amhlaoibh.

Arts and literature
Sydney, Lady Morgan, publishes her romantic novel with political overtones, The O'Briens and the O'Flahertys, in London.

Births
January – Bernard Diamond, soldier, recipient of the Victoria Cross for gallantry in 1857 at Bolandshahr, India (died 1892).
5 February – Peter Lalor, leader of the Eureka Stockade rebellion in Australia (died 1889).
27 April – Mary Ward, scientist (died 1869).
5 May – Thomas Francis Hendricken, first Bishop of Providence, Rhode Island (died 1886).
29 May – Timothy Daniel Sullivan, journalist, politician and poet, writer of the Irish national hymn God Save Ireland (died 1914).
3 September – John Drew, actor in the United States (died 1862).
10 December – Eugene O'Keefe, businessman and philanthropist in Canada (died 1913).
Full date unknown
Thomas Farrell, sculptor (died 1900).
James Owens, soldier, recipient of the Victoria Cross for gallantry in 1854 at Sebastopol, in the Crimea (died 1901).

Deaths
14 November – Thomas Addis Emmet, lawyer and politician, member of United Irishmen (born 1764).

References

 
Years of the 19th century in Ireland
1820s in Ireland
Ireland
 Ireland